José "Pepillo" Romero was a Cuban baseball pitcher and outfielder in the Cuban League. He played with the Feista club in 1897, Habana in 1899 and 1900, Almendares in 1901 and 1903, Club Fé in 1902, and Carmelita and Nuevo Criollo in 1904.

References

External links

1878 births
Cuban League players
Cuban baseball players
Almendares (baseball) players
Carmelita players
Club Fé players
Habana players
Year of death unknown